A postscript (P.S., PS, PS.) is an afterthought, thought that is occurring after the letter has been written and signed. The term comes from the Latin post scriptum, an expression meaning "written after" (which may be interpreted in the sense of "that which comes after the writing").
A postscript may be a sentence, a paragraph, or occasionally many paragraphs added, often hastily and incidentally, after the signature of a letter or (sometimes) the main body of an essay or book. In a book or essay, a more carefully composed addition (e.g., for a second edition) is called an afterword. The word "postscript" has poetically been used to refer to any sort of addendum to some main work even if it is not attached to a main work, for example Søren Kierkegaard's book titled Concluding Unscientific Postscript. 

Sometimes when additional points are made after the first postscript, abbreviations such as P.P.S. (post-post-scriptum) and P.P.P.S. (post-post-post-scriptum) and so on are added, ad infinitum.

See also

 Addendum
 Appendix
 Afterword
 Nota bene
 Postface

References

Book design
Writing
Latin literary phrases